Mitrella suduirauti is a species of sea snail in the family Columbellidae, the dove snails.

Description
The length of the shell attains 21.6 mm.

Distribution
This species occurs in the Sulu Sea off the Philippines.

References

 Monsecour D. & Monsecour K. (2009). Two new species of Mitrella (Gastropoda: Neogastropoda: Columbellidae) from the Philippines. Novapex 10(1): 1-4

suduirauti
Gastropods described in 2009